Patterson Companies Inc is a medical supplies conglomerate primarily in the business of veterinary and dental products (ranging from xray equipment to consumable products, dental consumables make up the biggest part of the dental industry).  Traditionally a dental company, it diversified its business at the turn of the millennium when it acquired 55-year-old company, JA Webster Inc, a distributor of veterinary products. That business segment (now known as Patterson Veterinary) currently distributes equipment (diagnostic and surgical) and medicine (anaesthetics, vaccines). The company operates directly in only the US and Canada (in Canada through subsidiary Patterson Dental Canada).

In 2008 it was noted as having one of the lowest debt ratios among companies in the health care sector.  Patterson was also a member of the Nasdaq-100 until December 10, 2010 when it and six other companies were replaced.  The Nasdaq-100 is composed of the 100 largest non financial stocks traded on the Nasdaq.

On June 17, 2010 Patterson Medical purchased the rehabilitation part of Ireland-based DCC Healthcare (Days Healthcare, Physiomed and Ausmedic) in a move that increased Patterson Medical's revenue by 16.43% (US$70 million, fiscal year ended April 24, 2010).  The new companies were added to its Homecraft Rolyan unit in the UK.

History

The company traces its roots through division Patterson Dental Supply back to one established in 1878 named Patterson Dental Company.  It remained focused solely on the dental products market until the 21st century when it branched out into the veterinary supplies market through 2 large acquisitions, JA Webster in 2001 (92.5 million dollars) and ProVet in 2004.  For about 130 years it dealt only in dental supplies.  It began selling rehabilitation supplies in 2004 after acquiring Ability One Products Corporation followed by Medco the same year.

It went public on the Nasdaq in 1992 with an IPO of around 480 million dollars.

Key dates and events
1987 - Acquired D.L. Saslow Co another major distributor
1993 - Started doing business outside of the US by purchasing Healthco Canada.
1997 - purchased software developer Eaglesoft Inc a company founded by Scott R. Kabbes who 6 years later was made president of Patterson Dental Company.  It later became Patterson Technology Center 
2004 - CAESY Patient Education Systems was acquired.  It is used by the company to provide information relating to treatment procedures for patients.  As a subsidiary the company retained its name.
July 2004 - was renamed Patterson Companies Inc because by then it was not only in the business of dental equipment distribution, it also made software, served the veterinary market and supplied products for general medical use.  Until that time it was named Patterson Dental Company.
Dec 2008 - Patterson acquires Dolphin Imaging and Management Solutions to enhance their software portfolio to include Dolphin's dental specialty treatment planning and practice management software.

Business segments

Patterson Dental Supply, Inc, Patterson Veterinary Supply, Inc. (formerly Webster Veterinary Supply), are both core segments of the company.  Those core businesses branch out into many regional subsidiaries, most of which are based in the United States (except for Patterson Dental Canada (has 550 employees).  The majority of business in Canada comes from Quebec, Ontario, British Columbia, Alberta and Saskatchewan.  Software and hardware businesses are part of Patterson Dental.

Acquisitions 
On 26 April 2021, Patterson Veterinary Supply, Inc., has agreed to a deal to buy Miller Vet Holdings, LLC's assets.

Criticism and Controversy

FTP Server Databreach
In 2016, a security researcher named Justin Shafer found 22,000 patients data on an FTP Server owned by Patterson Dental. He was reportedly raided by the FBI.

Animal Welfare Issues
In 2017, photographs captured by a former employee of a Texas blood bank that Patterson Veterinary distributed products from showed greyhounds under duress. PETA revealed pictures and video taken at The Pet Blood Bank showing kenneled dogs with open wounds, rotting teeth and severely overgrown toenails. According to The Washington Post, "Pet Blood Bank owner Shane Altizer did not deny that the images were taken there, but said they predated his 2015 purchase of the company or were “moment snapshots” unrepresentative of overall conditions now."  A veterinarian who visited the facility earlier in the year said she found the dogs to be in satisfactory condition but after seeing the pictures, believed that “(T)he facility was ‘cleaned up’ before our touring...This certainly suggests that regional, state and/or federal regulation is warranted.”

On its website, Patterson said it had "ceased doing business" with the blood bank, which subsequently closed.

FTC Antitrust
In 2019, the FTC ruled that Patterson Dental, Henry Schein, Inc., and Benco Dental violated antitrust law by refusing to compete for the business of buying groups by colluding with each other. 

On November 8, 2019 the FTC's website states: "Judge Chappell held that Benco Dental Supply Company and Patterson Companies, Inc. conspired to refuse to provide discounts to, or otherwise serve, buying groups representing dental practitioners. The judge dismissed the charges against the third respondent, Henry Schein, Inc. "

References

External links 

Dental companies
Dental companies of the United States
Distribution companies of the United States
Companies based in Saint Paul, Minnesota
Companies listed on the Nasdaq
Health care companies based in Minnesota